Elachista steueri is a moth of the family Elachistidae. It is found in Germany, the Czech Republic and Poland.

References

steueri
Moths described in 1990
Moths of Europe